USS Etamin (AK-93) was the Liberty ship (EC2) Isaac Babbitt constructed for the US Maritime Commission (MARCOM) in 1943, for World War II service at a cost of $959,509. After acquisition by the US Navy, the ship was named Etamin, after the brightest star in the constellation Draco and manned by a US Coast Guard crew. After repairs, she served as a non-self-propelled floating warehouse for the rest of the war. The ship ended the war in the Philippines and was among fifteen hulls sold for scrap for a lump sum of $271,000.

Construction
Etamin was launched 25 April 1943, as Isaac Babbitt, MCE hull 1106, by Permanente Metals Corporation, Yard No. 2, Richmond, California, under a Maritime Commission (MARCOM) contract; acquired by the Navy 8 May 1943; and commissioned 25 May 1943.

Service history
She was assigned to the Naval Overseas Transportation Service (NOTS), 12th Naval District with operational control given to Commander, 7th Fleet Service Force.
 
The ship was one of five Navy manned Liberties assigned 8 December 1943 to the Southwest Pacific Area for service to meet Army requirements. She was active in the southwest Pacific Ocean issuing stores to the fleet and making minor repairs.

On 27 April 1944,Etamin was disabled by a torpedo hit in Milne Bay and towed to Cairns, Australia, where she decommissioned on 26 June 1944. The ship, no longer self-propelled because of the torpedo damage, was designated as an unclassified miscellaneous auxiliary (IX) and placed in service as Etamin (IX-173) on 12 August 1944 continuing to issue stores to the fleet while under tow. She was placed out of service on 9 July 1946 and stricken from the Navy List on 31 July.

Sale and scrapping
Returned to the MARCOM for disposal, the ship was laid up at Subic Bay, Philippines, 9 July 1946. She was one of fifteen vessels sold for scrap to Asia Development Corporation, Shanghai, for a total of $271,000.  She was sold 29 January 1948, and delivered 3 March 1948.

Awards
Etamin received two battle stars for World War II service.

References

Bibliography

External links

Crater-class cargo ships
World War II auxiliary ships of the United States
Ships built in Richmond, California
1943 ships
Maritime incidents in April 1944